The London Outer Orbital Path — more usually the "London LOOP" — is a 150-mile (242 km) signed walk along public footpaths, and through parks, woods and fields around the edge of Outer London, England, described as "the M25 for walkers". The walk begins at Erith on the south bank of the River Thames and passes clockwise through Crayford, Petts Wood, Coulsdon, Banstead, Ewell, Kingston upon Thames, Uxbridge, Elstree, Cockfosters, Chingford, Chigwell, Grange Hill and Upminster Bridge before ending at Purfleet, almost directly across the Thames from its starting point.  Between these settlements the route passes through green buffers and some of the highest points in Greater London.

History
The walk was first proposed at a meeting between The Ramblers and the Countryside Commission in 1990. It was given an official launch at the House of Lords in 1993. The first section was opened on 3 May 1996, with a ceremony on Farthing Downs, Coulsdon. Other sections followed at the rate of two or three per year as signs were installed and leaflets for individual sections published, the route becoming fully walkable in 2001. Following the election of Ken Livingstone as Mayor of London, the London Loop became one of his key routes, along with its sister route, the Capital Ring.

Route

The route is divided into 24 sections in three groups: the "blue" group in South London, the "green" group in north-west London, and the "yellow" group in north-east London. The sections vary in length, from  section 14 to  section 16. Some sections finish and/or end directly at public transport stops. However most sections have a further waymarked 'LOOP Link' to from their start and/or end to the nearest train or underground station. Additionally, there are waymarked 'LOOP Links' to train station midway along some sections. All these links are listed in the table below.

South London (sections 1–8)

The Loop officially begins by the River Thames in Erith. Points of interest in these sections south of the Thames include: Hall Place, the memorial to William Willett (advocate of summer time), the Wilberforce Oak, Shirley Windmill, Happy Valley, Farthing Downs, the Mayfield Lavender Farm and the Coronation Stone in Kingston.

North-west London (sections 9–16)

Having crossed the Thames at Kingston Bridge the Loop continues north of the river. Points of interest in these sections include: Bushy Park, the Shot Tower by the River Crane, the Grand Union Canal, the ancient woodland of Park Wood, Grim's Dyke and a cottage where David Livingstone once lived.

North-east London (sections 17–24)

Commencing at Cockfosters, the final third of the Loop heads south to its end at the Thames in Purfleet. Points of interest in these sections include: the New River, Forty Hall, Gilwell Park, Queen Elizabeth's Hunting Lodge in Epping Forest, the Wellingtonia Avenue in Havering Country Park, the valley of the River Ingrebourne, the Upminster Windmill, Hornchurch Country Park, the Concrete Barges by the Thames at Rainham and the RSPB Centre by the marshes at Purfleet.

Signposts, waymarks and information boards direct the walker along the route. In countryside locations the waymarks consist mostly of a simple white disc mounted on a wooden post, with a directional arrow and flying kestrel logo in blue and text in green. However, local authorities are responsible for funding these signs, so the quality varies from one borough to the next, with some sections not signed at all. The 54-mile blue route from Erith to Kingston is maintained by the Downlands Countryside Management Project, a joint initiative by several councils, and is complete with signs and information boards, in addition to maps available from Tourist Information Centres.

There is no way to cross the river between Purfleet and Erith to complete the loop, although there was once a ferry to Erith which was mainly used by pilgrims on their way to Canterbury. In 2011 a proposal for a ferry to link the ends, and to link to riverbuses upstream at Woolwich, was shortlisted in the RIBA Forgotten Spaces competition.

The full route is also mapped on OpenStreetMap and available on the Go Jauntly app, in partnership with Transport for London.

Further reading
Colin Saunders (2017) The London Loop Aurum Press. ISBN 978 1 78131 561 3

Detailed guidance for walking the LOOP updated by Ramblers volunteers - free downloads from the Inner London Ramblers web site.

References

External links

Route of the LOOP on Waymarked trails (from OpenStreetMap data).
The LOOP on the Go Jauntly app, in partnership with Transport for London.
New guidance for walking the Loop with enhanced maps can be freely downloaded from the Inner London Ramblers website.
News of temporary obstructions or diversion affecting the Loop from Inner London Ramblers.

Transport in the London Borough of Bexley
Transport in the London Borough of Bromley
Transport in the London Borough of Croydon
Footpaths in Surrey
Transport in the London Borough of Sutton
Epsom and Ewell
Transport in the Royal Borough of Kingston upon Thames
Transport in the London Borough of Richmond upon Thames
Transport in the London Borough of Hounslow
Transport in the London Borough of Hillingdon
Transport in the London Borough of Barnet
Transport in the London Borough of Enfield
Hertsmere
Transport in the London Borough of Waltham Forest
Epping Forest District
Transport in the London Borough of Redbridge
Transport in the London Borough of Havering
Long-distance footpaths in England
Parks and open spaces in the London Borough of Croydon
Footpaths in London
Footpaths in Hertfordshire